The 2021–22 Lebanese Women's Football League was the 15th edition of the Lebanese Women's Football League since it was formed in 2008.

It began on 10 April 2021 and ended on 31 July. Eight teams participated, who played each other in a double round-robin tournament. SAS won their eighth league title, after beating defending champions Safa 2–1 in the final matchday.

League table

References

External links
 RSSSF.com

Lebanese Women's Football League seasons
W1
Lebanese Women's Football League